Aransas County Independent School District  is an independent county-wide school district based in 
Rockport, Texas, United States. The district serves a  area that covers most of Aransas County, including the city of Rockport, the town of Fulton, and the unincorporated communities of Holiday Beach and Lamar.

History
The first public school in Aransas County was instituted in 1884 where the Rockport city water tower once stood. In 1886 a one-room school house was built in Fulton. A one-room school at Sparks Colony followed. The school met in various places and land was sought for the location of a permanent building to house the school. The land was purchased and the building completed in 1892. It was constructed at the site of present-day Rockport Elementary. On May 17, 1907, four girls and two boys graduated from the Rockport High School in a ceremony held at the Bailey Pavilion, built over the water across from where the Wells Fargo Bank now stands. It was the first graduating class in the history of the school.

Between 1893 and 1949, seven Common School Districts were in existence in the county. In June 1949, these districts voted to consolidate and became the Aransas County Independent School District.

In 1935 Rockport School was erected, now known as Rockport Elementary. In 1953, a new high school was opened at its present location on a site between Fulton and Rockport. In 1957 Fulton Elementary School opened; and in 1988 an additional building on the south side of the existing campus was completed. In September 1963, classes were opened in the new Junior High; and in September, 1967, the Live Oak Elementary School was opened. The most recent construction was Rockport-Fulton Middle School and renovations to Rockport-Fulton High School connecting the high school to the old Jr. High, creating a larger campus to service the High School students of Aransas County.

Damage from Hurricane Harvey led to school activities being suspended indefinitely.

Finances
As of the 2010-2011 school year, the appraised valuation of property in the district was $2,456,442,000. The maintenance tax rate was $0.104 and the bond tax rate was $0.005 per $100 of appraised valuation.

Academic achievement
In 2011, the school district was rated "recognized" by the Texas Education Agency.  Thirty-five percent of districts in Texas in 2011 received the same rating. No state accountability ratings will be given to districts in 2012. A school district in Texas can receive one of four possible rankings from the Texas Education Agency: Exemplary (the highest possible ranking), Recognized, Academically Acceptable, and Academically Unacceptable (the lowest possible ranking).

Historical district TEA accountability ratings
2011: Recognized
2010: Recognized
2009: Recognized
2008: Recognized
2007: Academically Acceptable
2006: Academically Acceptable
2005: Academically Acceptable
2004: Recognized

Schools

In the 2011-2012 school year, the district had students in five schools. 
 Rockport-Fulton High School (Grades 9-12)
 Rockport-Fulton Middle School (Grades 6-8)
 Fulton 4-5 Learning Center (Grades 4-5)
 Live Oak 1-3 Learning Center (Grades 1-3)
 Little Bay Primary School (Grades EE-KG)

See also

List of school districts in Texas
List of high schools in Texas

References

External links
 

School districts in Aransas County, Texas
School districts established in 1949